Hamzian-e Olya (also Romanized as Ḩamzīān-e ‘Olyā and Ḩamzīān ‘Olya; also known as Ḩamzīān-e Bālā) is a village in Churs Rural District, in the Central District of Chaypareh County, West Azerbaijan Province, Iran. At the 2006 census, its population was 94, in 23 families.

References 

Populated places in Chaypareh County